Kiwi Bus Builders is a New Zealand bus bodybuilder based in Tauranga.

History

Kiwi Bus Builders was established in 1993. It has built bus and coach bodies for many operators including Go Bus Transport, NZ Bus and Tranzit Coachlines.

In 2011, Kiwi Bus Builders entered an agreement with Alexander Dennis to assemble 120 Enviro200 buses for NZ Bus. This was followed by an order for a further 40.

References

Alexander Dennis
Bus manufacturers of New Zealand
Companies based in Tauranga
Tauranga
Vehicle manufacturing companies established in 1993
New Zealand companies established in 1993